Hasan M. Elahi (born 1972) is a Bangladeshi-born American interdisciplinary media artist whose work has an emphasis on technology and media and their social implications. His research interests include issues of surveillance, sousveillance, simulated time, transport systems, and borders and frontiers.

He was born in Rangpur and raised in New York City.

Sousveillance

As presented in a panel discussion on "Sousveillance-Culture" led by Marisa Olson, Curator and Editor of Rhizome, with Panelists: Amy Alexander, Jill Magid and Hasan Elahi, Elahi has put his entire life online. Wired magazine reports:

Poke around his site and you'll find more than 20,000 images stretching back three years. Elahi has documented nearly every waking hour of his life during that time. He posts copies of every debit card transaction, so you can see what he bought, where, and when. A GPS device in his pocket reports his real-time physical location on a map.
Elahi's site is the perfect alibi. Or an audacious art project. Or both. The Bangladeshi-born American says the US government mistakenly listed him on its terrorist watch list — and once you're on, it's hard to get off. To convince the Feds of his innocence, Elahi has made his life an open book. Whenever they want, officials can go to his site and see where he is and what he's doing. Indeed, his server logs show hits from the Pentagon, the Secretary of Defense, and the Executive Office of the President, among others.

The globe-hopping prof says his overexposed life began in 2002, when he stepped off a flight from the Netherlands and was detained at the Detroit airport. He says FBI agents later told him they'd been tipped off that he was hoarding explosives in a Florida storage unit; subsequent lie detector tests convinced them he wasn't their man. But with his frequent travel — Elahi logs more than 70,000 air miles a year exhibiting his art work and attending conferences — he figured it was only a matter of time before he got hauled in again. He might even be shipped off to Gitmo before anyone realized their mistake. The FBI agents had given him their phone number, so he decided to call before each trip; that way, they could alert the field offices. He hasn't been detained since.

Exhibitions
He recently was invited to speak about his work at the Tate Modern, Einstein Forum, and at the American Association of Artificial Intelligence. His work has been presented in numerous exhibitions at venues such as the Centre Georges Pompidou, Sundance Film Festival, Kassel Kulturbahnhof, The Hermitage, and at the Venice Biennale. His work has been supported with significant grants and numerous sponsorships from Creative Capital, Ford Foundation/Philip Morris, and the Asociación Artetik Berrikuntzara in Donostia-San Sebastián in the Basque Country/ Spain.

Faculty positions
Elahi is a professor of art and Dean of the College of Fine, Performing and Communication Arts at Wayne State University in Detroit, Michigan. Previously he was director of the school of art at George Mason University. Before that, he was an associate professor at the University of Maryland, and director of the Digital Cultures and Creativity Honors program. He also taught at Rutgers University, New Jersey, San Jose State University; Rutgers; the University of South Florida in Tampa, Florida; West Virginia University; Wanganui School of Design, in Wanganui, New Zealand; and also in Houston, Texas.

See also
 Internet activism
 Tactical media

References

External links
 Tracking Transience
 Hasan Elahi site
 CBS Evening News (June 18, 2007)
 The Colbert Report Interview (May 7, 2008)
 
 Hasan Elahi: FBI, here I am! (TEDGlobal 2011)

Sculptors from New York (state)
American video artists
American conceptual artists
Interdisciplinary artists
Postmodern artists
American performance artists
1972 births
Living people
Bangladeshi emigrants to the United States
People from Rangpur District
University of Maryland, College Park faculty
San Jose State University faculty
Rutgers University faculty
University of South Florida faculty